Lindsey is an unincorporated community in Ottawa County, Kansas, United States, less than  southeast of Minneapolis, Kansas.  A railroad line belonging to Kyle Railroad runs through the center of the community.  The railroad does not have a siding or stop in Lindsey.  Only one road (which is paved with asphalt), North 135th Road, runs through the community.  Lindsey consists of about a half dozen residences.

History
Lindsey Creek was named after a trapper named Lindsey, who had trapped in the area since 1857. Lindsey was the first county seat of Ottawa County. It was built in close proximity of Fort Solomon, so the town could take advantage of the protection the fort offered.

By the late 1860s the use of Fort Solomon was coming to an end, as problems between the white settlers and the Indians disappeared.  In 1871 the fort had only a few cabins left.  Lindsey was in decline, too, and was no longer the county seat.  

Today Lindsey consists of about a half dozen residences and no businesses.

Education
The community is served by North Ottawa County USD 239 public school district.

References

Further reading

External links
 Ottawa County maps: Current, Historic, KDOT

Unincorporated communities in Ottawa County, Kansas
Unincorporated communities in Kansas